The yellow golden mole (Calcochloris obtusirostris) is a species of mammal in the family Chrysochloridae. It is found in Mozambique , South Africa (KwaZulu-natal and the Limpopo), and Zimbabwe. The yellow golden mole's natural habitats are subtropical or tropical dry and moist lowland forests, savanna, arable land, pasture, plantations, and rural gardens. 

C. o. chrysillus occurs in coastal forests, savannas and northern KwaZulu-natal. All species of the calcohloris live close to human settlements and thrive in urban gardens and rural places. 

Yellow golden moles are likely to dig at the base of trees and create underground "nest" in which they forage for food. Its diet mainly consists of insecta, small lizards, flies, and other tiny animals found underground.

Conservation Status 
This species has been classified as NT(Near Threatened) but the population trend is unknown.

References

Afrosoricida
Mammals of Mozambique
Mammals of South Africa
Mammals of Tanzania
Least concern biota of Africa
Taxonomy articles created by Polbot
Mammals described in 1851
Taxa named by Wilhelm Peters